Malila is a Bantu language of Tanzania.

References

Rukwa languages
Languages of Tanzania